The House of Discord (1913) is a silent American drama film directed by James Kirkwood, Sr., written by F. E. Woods and A. Clayton Harris from a play by William C. deMille. The film stars Lionel Barrymore and marked the theatrical film debut of actor Jack Mulhall.

Synopsis 
A mother attempts to save her daughter from making a social mistake after she finds it similar to one she had once faced herself.

Cast
Marshall Neilan as The Wife
Blanche Sweet as The Husband
Jack Mulhall as The Wife's Sweetheart
Dorothy Gish as The Daughter
Lionel Barrymore as The Daughter's Sweetheart
James Kirkwood, Sr. as The Sister-in-Law
Antonio Moreno as The Sister-in-Law's Sweetheart

Production
The House of Discord was directed by James Kirkwood, Sr. The film stars Lionel Barrymore. In addition to Barrymore, it also stars Blanche Sweet, Dorothy Gish, Marshall Neilan, Antonio Moreno, and Jack Mulhall. This was Mulhall's first theatrical film role; he portrayed a juvenile character which the titular discord centered on. The film was produced by Klaw & Erlanger and Biograph Company.

The screenplay was written by F. E. Woods from a play by William C. deMille, and was produced by Marc Klaw and Abraham Erlanger. The film is a silent two-reeler. Cinematographer Tony Gaudio was nearly fired during production after he attempted to reproduce the glow cast from a fireplace, rather than employing the fixed, flat lighting that was accepted practice at the time.

Release
The film was released theatrically on December 13, 1913 by the General Film Company. A reviewer for The Moving Picture World wrote that it "will be readily appreciated by women" and that it is a "woman's story" which "reaches its most effective emotional passages in showing the influence of a mother over a daughter who is on the verge of making a serious mistake."

Preservation status
The House of Discord is now in the public domain. A print of the film survives at the Museum of Modern Art in New York City.

References

External links

The House of Discord at SilentEra

1913 films
Films directed by James Kirkwood Sr.
American black-and-white films
American films based on plays
1913 drama films
American silent short films
Silent American drama films
1910s American films